Christian López or Lopez may refer to:

 Christian López (weightlifter) (1984–2013), Guatemalan weightlifter
 Christian Lopez (footballer) (born 1953), French former football defender
 Christian Lopez (musician) (born 1995), American folk rock singer-songwriter
 Christian Javier López (born 1992), Mexican football midfielder
 Christian Roberto López (born 1987), Mexican football defender

See also
 Christian Lopes (born 1992), American baseball player
 Cristian López (born 1989), Spanish football forward